Campbell Christie (1893–1963) was an Indian-born British playwright and screenwriter who frequently collaborated with his wife Dorothy Christie on plays such as Carrington V.C., His Excellency and Someone at the Door.

Selected filmography
 Jassy (1947)
 Carrington V.C. (1955)
 The Long Arm (1956)

Selected plays
 Someone at the Door (1935)
 Grand National Night (1945)
 His Excellency (1950)
 Carrington V.C. (1953)

References

External links

1893 births
1963 deaths
British male screenwriters
20th-century British male writers
20th-century British screenwriters
British people in colonial India